The orange-fingered myotis or red-painted myotis (Myotis rufopictus) is a species of vesper bat endemic to the Philippines.

Taxonomy 
It was described in 1845 as a distinct species by George Robert Waterhouse, but later reclassified as conspecific with or as a subspecies of Hodgson's bat (M. formosus). However, a 2014 morphological study found major divergence between M. formosus and M. rufopictus, and thus split them from one another. This has also been followed by the American Society of Mammalogists, the IUCN Red List, and the ITIS.

Distribution and habitat 
It is found only in the northern and central islands of the Philippines. It ranges from Palawan north to Luzon and southeast to Negros. Its natural habitat is lowland and montane tropical forest, as well as agricultural fields.

Status 
This species is likely threatened by deforestation for development, logging, agriculture, and mining in the lowland parts of its distribution. However, due to doubts over its extent of occurrence, status, and ecological requirements, it is classified as Data Deficient by the IUCN Red List.

References 

Mouse-eared bats
Mammals of the Philippines
Endemic fauna of the Philippines
Bats of Asia
Mammals described in 1845
Taxa named by George Robert Waterhouse